Vemavaram may refer to:

A. Vemavaram
Vemavaram, Krishna district, Andhra Pradesh, India